Thorhilda Mary Vivia "Thorda" Abbott-Watt OBE (born 11 February 1955) is a British diplomat who currently serves as British High Commissioner to Tonga.

Career 
Abbott-Watt joined the Foreign and Commonwealth Office (FCO) in 1974 and has worked both in London and in a number of countries in South America, the Far East and Western and Eastern Europe.  In 1989 she served in the FCO, negotiating the renunciation of Four Power Rights in Germany.  From 2001 to 2002 she was Chargée d'Affaires, opening the first British Embassy in Dushanbe, Tajikistan.

In 2003 Abbott-Watt became Ambassador to Armenia, a role she held for two years. In 2004, questions were raised about her competency in a letter to Foreign and Commonwealth Secretary, Jack Straw by scholar Tessa Hofmann and the International Group on Genocide Recognition and Prevention, after she made a statement at a press conference on 20 January 2004 questioning the use of the term genocide for the Armenian genocide. Abbott-Watt said, "Great Britain accepts that the events of 1915 were mass killings [of the Armenian population] – the responsible for which are the Turks. I see no problem calling it brutality. It shouldn’t have taken place even in the course of war. But I do not think that recognizing the events as genocide would be of much use."

In 2006 Abbott-Watt worked briefly as Head of Political and Military Section in Kabul, then undertook an attachment to UK Trade & Investment as Head of Strategy and Innovation. She served as Ambassador to Mongolia from 2008 to 2009 and from 2010 to 2012. On 9 May 2016, she was appointed Ambassador to Turkmenistan.

She was appointed Officer of the Order of the British Empire (OBE) in the 2017 Birthday Honours. In 2020, Abbott-Watt was made the first British High Commissioner to Tonga since 2006, with the re-opening of an embassy in Nuku'alofa.

Personal life
Abbott-Watt is married to Reef Talbot Hogg. Her father was a soldier and diplomat and her mother a premiere danseuse with the Ballet Russe. She was educated at Stonar School, Wiltshire.

References

1955 births
Living people
People educated at Stonar School
Ambassadors of the United Kingdom to Armenia
Ambassadors of the United Kingdom to Turkmenistan
Ambassadors of the United Kingdom to Mongolia
Officers of the Order of the British Empire
British women ambassadors